Kuils River (Afrikaans: Kuilsrivier) is a town in the Western Cape, South Africa, 25 km (15 miles) east of Cape Town CBD at the gateway of the Cape Winelands. It is also the name of the main tributary of the Eerste River, and forms part of the Eastern Suburbs of the City of Cape Town.

Origin

Originally named De Boss, Kuils River was a refreshment post of the Dutch East India Company in 1680, also known as de Kuijlen.  In 1700 the farm Leeuwenhof and other parts of de Kuijlen were sold to Olof Bergh.

Developments during the 19th and 20th century
It started to develop into a village. A church was founded by Rhenish Missionary Society in 1843 in Sarepta. A proper road was built in 1845, a railway station in 1862 and a school in 1898. In 1898 stands were sold for residential development. On 4 December 1950 it attained municipal status.

Administration and location

Kuils River is a level two administrative region, and is close to Stellenbosch It is located near the intersection of the M12 and the R102.

Kuils River is home to the respective Jan du Toit and Alta Kriel Schools, both solely for the purposes of mentally challenged children. and is the birthplace of Herman Charles Bosman (3 February 1905); journalist, poet and author. He is regarded as one of South Africa's greatest ever writers (in English).

The industrial area Blackheath is in Kuils River.

Transport

Roads 
Kuils River’s main road is the R102 which runs the town including its Central Business District (CBD) as “Van Riebeeck Road”, connecting it to Bellville in the west and Somerset West in the south-east. 

Kuils River has access to one main highway, the R300 (Kuils River Freeway) connecting the town to the N1 highway (to Cape Town and Paarl) in the north to the N2 highway (to Cape Town International Airport, Cape Town and Somerset West) and Mitchells Plain in the south. 

Kuils River is served by a network of metropolitan routes within the City of Cape Town including the M12 (Stellenbosch Arterial; Polkadraai Road) to Cape Town International Airport, Elsie’s River and Stellenbosch, M23 (Bottelary Road) to Bellville and Stellenbosch, M32 (Nooiensfontein Road) to Blue Downs and the M100 (Saxdowns Road) to Brackenfell.

Coat of arms

Kuils River was a municipality from 1950 to 1996. The town council assumed a coat of arms, designed  by Ivan Mitford-Barberton, in 1955 and registered it with the Cape Provincial Administration in January 1956. 

The shield was divided into three horizontal sections: (1) a running buck on a silver background, (2) a golden yoke on a red background, and (3) four silver and blue stripes with wavy edges.  The crest was a bull's head, and the motto Via trita via tuta.

References

Suburbs of Cape Town